3DA was an alliance formed between The Santa Cruz Operation (SCO) and Hewlett Packard (HP) in September 1995.  Its purpose was to unify SCO's OpenServer product, UnixWare (newly acquired from Novell), and HP-UX from HP; the resulting product would then become the de facto Unix standard for both existing x86 systems and the upcoming IA-64 processor architecture from Intel.

In September 1996, SCO announced that they were offering a "code-level preview" of the system, codenamed Gemini.

By 1998 the alliance had ground to a halt, setting the stage for Project Monterey.

References

 
 

HP software
Unix history